was a district located in Ishikari Subprefecture, Hokkaido, Japan.

As of 2004, the district had an estimated population of 2,179 and a density of 7.00 persons per km2. The total area was 311.16 km2.

Former towns and villages
 Hamamasu

Merger
 On October 1, 2005, the village of Hamamasu, along with the village of Atsuta (from Atsuta District), was merged into the expanded city of Ishikari.

Former districts of Hokkaido